Srbijada is the common name for the Annual Serbian North American Soccer Tournament. The tournament is held every year in North America during Labor Day weekend.

The Tournament 
Every year, the tournament is held in a new city and has a new host club. By 2011, 19 consecutive tournaments were held. In 2012 the 20th tournament was held in Paterson, New Jersey on August 31 through September 3. The first Srbijada was held in 1993. The tournament took place in Windsor, Ontario; and the hosting club was Windsor Serbs.

During Srbijada, four competitions are held. Tournaments are held in open, over 30 and over 40 categories, and the latest addition was the over 50 division. Both open and over 30 categories have been in existence since the beginning of the tournament, while over 40 category was added to the tournament program in 1998.

This tournament is very similar to the Karadjordje Cup which takes place in Australia.

Purpose of the tournament 
 To establish a traditional annual sporting event for Serbs in North America
 To promote the game of soccer among Serbian athletes
 To bring Serbian people from different Serbian communities together
 To enhance and promote the Serbian name across North America
 To financially help the hosting team
 To expand the athletic competition to other disciplines

Past tournaments

Open division winners

Over 30 division

Over 40 division

Over 50 division

Serbian Soccer Clubs in diaspora

Canada

 Njegos S.C.; Hamilton
 Republika Srpska F.C; Hamilton
 Hamilton Serbians S.C.; Hamilton
 Srbija FC; Niagara Falls
 Sveti Stefan F.C.; Ottawa
 Sumadija; Hamilton
 White Eagles S.C.;Vancouver
 Serbian White Eagles; Toronto
 Windsor Serbs; Windsor
 Winona Serbs; Hamilton
 FC Serbia United; Vancouver

United States

 United Serbs - S.B.H; Chicago, Illinois
 White Eagles; Paterson, New Jersey
 SSK Karadjordje; Cleveland, Ohio
 FK Ujedinjeni Srbi; Milwaukee, Wisconsin
 FK Ravna Gora; Los Angeles, California
 FK Srbija; New York, New York
 FK Republika Srpska; Chicago, Illinois
 FK Morava - S.B.H; Chicago, Illinois
 FK Nikola Tesla; Chicago, Illinois
 FK Pingvini; Orlando, Florida
 White Eagles SC; Paterson, New Jersey
 FK Drina; San Jose, California
 FK Gavrilo Princip; Akron, Ohio
 Crvena Zvezda; St. Louis, Missouri
 SC White Eagles; Atlanta, Georgia
 United Serbs East Coast;Parsippany, New Jersey
 FK Soko Rokford; Rockford, Illinois
 FK Sloga; Fort Worth, Texas

Australia

 Canberra White Eagles
 Bonnyrigg White Eagles
 White City Woodville
 White City Football Club
 Dianella White Eagles
 Berwick Kings Krajina
 Fitzroy City Serbia
 Noble Park United
 Springvale White Eagles
 Westgate Sindjelic
 Albion Park White Eagles
 Maddington Eagles

Germany

 KSV Tempo; Frankfurt
 FC Jadran Mannheim 1969 e.V.; Mannheim
 SK Srbija; München
 FC-Srbija Ulm; Ulm
 FC Jugoslavija; Freiburg
 FC Srbija Kassel; Kassel
 SKV Jedinstvo; Ludwigsburg
 FK Crvena Zvezda; Stuttgart
 SV Sveti Sava; Reutlingen
 OFK Beograd Stuttgart e.V. 1971; Stuttgart
 FC JAT Fellbach e.V.; Fellbach

Switzerland

 FK Srbija; Uzwil
 FK Republika Srpska; Zurich
 FC Sloboda; Basel
 SK Jugoslavija; Zurich
 FK Srbija; Luzern

Austria

 Crvena Zvezda; Schalchen
 FK Buducnost; Schwechat
 FK Beograd; Wien
 FK Crvena Zvezda; Wien
 FK Hajduk Veljko; Wien
 FK Jedinstvo; Wien
 FK Kristal; Wien
 FK Udarnik; Oberlam
 FK Borac; Rankweil
 FK Drina; Lustenau
 FK Korenita; Feldkirch
 FK Kozara; Bregenz
 FK Sloga; Hard
 FK Banja Luka; Bludenz

References

External links 
 www.Srbijada.com -  Srbijada website (Serbian)
 Official website of 2007 Srbijada in Vancouver (English)
 Official website of 2008 Srbijada to be held in Hamilton (English)
 Srbijada 2009 information
 Srbijada 2010 Phoenix info (Serbian/English)
 Chicago 2011 info (English)

Serbian-American culture
Serbian-Canadian culture
Serbian diaspora
Canadian soccer friendly trophies
American soccer friendly trophies
Serb diaspora